Xhafer Tahiri (born 15 August 1983) is a politician in Kosovo. He was a member of the Assembly of the Republic of Kosovo from 2013 to 2014 and was the mayor of Vushtrri (Serbian: Vučitrn) from 2017 to 2021. Tahiri is a member of the Democratic League of Kosovo (Lidhja Demokratike e Kosovës, LDK).

Early life and career
Tahiri was born in the village of Donje Stanovce (Albanian: Stanoc i Poshtëm) in the municipality of Vučitrn (Albanian: Vushtrri), in what was then the Socialist Autonomous Province of Kosovo in the Socialist Republic of Serbia, Socialist Federal Republic of Yugoslavia. He graduated from the University of Pristina Faculty of Law in 2004, earned a master's degree the following year from the University of Bologna in Italy, and has worked toward a Ph.D. at the law faculty of the University of Graz in Austria. Tahiri has lectured at Haxhi Zeka University in Peja and now works as a lecturer at the University of Pristina. 

He was the director of the department for legal affairs and international relations in the office of Kosovo's presidency between 2006 and 2016 and was a member of the supervisory board for Kosovo's Anti-Corruption Agency from 2007 to 2009. After Kosovo's unilateral declaration of independence in 2008, he served on a committee reviewing border demarcation issues between Kosovo and Macedonia (now North Macedonia). He was also a representative of the Kosovo president's office on the Consultation Council for Minorities.

Politician
Tahiri became active with the LDK's youth organization in the 2000s and served as its president from 2009 to 2012. The party experienced serious divisions in late 2011; as a supporter of former party president Fatmir Sejdiu, Tahiri briefly saw his standing fall in the party and was not re-elected to its youth forum in Vushtrri.

Assembly member
Due to his position as chair of the LDK's youth wing, Tahiri was given the thirty-fifth position on the party's electoral list in the 2010 Kosovan parliamentary election. The election was held under open list proportional representation, and Tahiri finished in thirty-first place among the LDK's candidates. As the list won twenty-seven seats, he was not initially elected. He did, however, receive a mandate on 26 December 2013 as the replacement for another party member. In the assembly, Tahiri was a member of the public finance oversight committee. The LDK served in opposition during this time.

Tahiri was again included on the LDK's list in the 2014 Kosovan parliamentary election, this time in the sixty-seventh position. He finished in fifty-sixth place among the party's candidates; the list won thirty mandates and he was not re-elected.

Mayor of Vushtrri
Tahiri was elected as mayor of Vushtrri in the 2017 Kosovan local elections, defeating Ferit Idrizi of the rival Democratic Party of Kosovo (Partia Demokratike e Kosovës, PDK) in the second round. He served as mayor of the municipality for the next four years.

In 2020, Tahiri opposed the LDK's decision to remove Vjosa Osmani from the party leadership.

He was defeated by Idrizi in the 2021 local elections in a rematch from four years earlier.

Electoral record

Local

Notes

References

1983 births
Living people
Kosovo Albanians
People from Vushtrri
Members of the Assembly of the Republic of Kosovo
Mayors of places in Kosovo
Democratic League of Kosovo politicians